The Eastern Front counteroffensive (April–July 1919) was an episode of the Russian Civil War.

Background 
In 1917, the Russian Bolshevik Party staged a revolution against Alexander Kerensky's Provisional Government that led to a civil war.  During the spring of 1919 the Kolchak army offensive created a strategic breakthrough in the center of The Red Army's Eastern Font, while the Reds were preparing their own offensive on the southern flank.

Idea 
At the time of the White Army offensive, the Reds had a big force on the southern flank. The White army was dispersed in several groups and the Reds attempted to crush those groups from south to north one by one. Reserves were used to rebuild the Red's 5th Army and delay the Whites' advancement in the center of the front.

Battles 
On the southern flank, the White Orenburg Independent Army tried to capture Orenburg without success. New commander General Petr Belov decided to use his reserve, the 4th Corps, to outflank Orenburg from the north. But Red commander Gaya Gai regrouped and crushed the Whites during a 3-day battle from 22–25 April and the remains of the White forces changed sides. As a result, there was no cover for the White Western Army's rear communications (commander Mikhail Hanzhin). On April, 25, the Supreme Command of the Reds' Eastern Front ordered an advance.

On April, 28, the Reds crushed 2 divisions of the Whites in the region to the south-east of Buguruslan. While suppressing the flank of the advancing White armies, the Reds' command ordered the Southern Group to advance to the North-West. On May, 4, the Red 5th Army captured Buguruslan, and the Whites had to quickly retreat to Bugulma. On May, 6, Mikhail Frunze (commander of Red's Southern Group) attempted to surround the White Forces, but the Whites quickly retreated to the east. On May 13, the Red 5th Army captured Bugulma without a fight.

Aleksandr Samoilo (new commander of the Red's Eastern Front) took the 5th Army from the Southern Group and ordered a strike on the Northeast in retribution for their assistance to the Northern Group. The Southern Group was reinforced by 2 rifle divisions. The outflanked Whites had to retreat from Belebey to the east, but Samoilo didn't realize that the Whites were defeated and ordered his troops to stop. Frunze didn't agree and on May 19, Samoilo ordered his troops to pursue the enemy.

The Whites concentrated 6 infantry regiments near Ufa and decided to outflank the Turkestan Army. On May, 28, the Whites crossed the Belaya River, but were crushed on May 29. On May 30, the Red 5th Army also crossed the Belaya River and captured Birsk on June 7. Also on June 7 the Red's Southern Group crossed the Belaya River and captured Ufa on June 9. On June 16 the Whites began a general retreat in the eastern direction on the whole front.

Aftermath 
The defeat of the Whites in the Center and South, enabled the Red Army to cross the Ural mountains. The advance of the Red Army in the Center and South forced the Whites' Northern group (the Siberian Army) to retreat, because the Red armies were now able to cut its communications.

Sources 
 Н.Е.Какурин, И.И.Вацетис "Гражданская война. 1918–1921" (N.E.Kakurin, I.I.Vacietis "Civil War. 1918–1921") – Sankt-Peterburg, "Polygon" Publishing House, 2002. 

Battles of the Russian Civil War